Mycoplasma is a genus of bacteria that, like the other members of the class Mollicutes, lack a cell wall around their cell membranes. Peptidoglycan (murein) is absent. This characteristic makes them naturally resistant to antibiotics that target cell wall synthesis (like the beta-lactam antibiotics). They can be parasitic or saprotrophic. Several species are pathogenic in humans, including M. pneumoniae, which is an important cause of "walking" pneumonia and other respiratory disorders, and M. genitalium, which is believed to be involved in pelvic inflammatory diseases. Mycoplasma species (like the other species of the class Mollicutes) are among the smallest organisms yet discovered, can survive without oxygen, and come in various shapes. For example, M. genitalium is flask-shaped (about 300 x 600 nm), while M. pneumoniae is more elongated (about 100 x 1000 nm), many Mycoplasma species are coccoid. Hundreds of Mycoplasma species infect animals.

The trivial name “mycoplasma” (plural mycoplasmas or mycoplasms) is commonly used for all members of the class Mollicutes. In scientific classification, the designation Mycoplasma refers exclusively to the genus, a member of the Mycoplasmataceae, the only family of the order Mycoplasmatales (see “scientific classification”).

Etymology 
The term "mycoplasma", from the Greek μύκης,  (fungus) and πλάσμα,  (formed), was first used by Albert Bernhard Frank in 1889 to describe an altered state of plant cell cytoplasm resulting from infiltration by fungus-like microorganisms. Julian Nowak later proposed the name mycoplasma for certain filamentous microorganisms imagined to have both cellular and acellular stages in their lifecycles, which could explain how they were visible with a microscope, but passed through filters impermeable to other bacteria. Later, the name for these mycoplasmas was pleuropneumonia-like organisms (PPLO), broadly referring to organisms similar in colonial morphology and filterability to the causative agent (a Mycoplasma species) of contagious bovine pleuropneumonia. At present, all these organisms are classified as Mollicutes and the term Mycoplasma refers solely to the genus.

Species that infect humans
Species of Mycoplasma, other than those listed below, have been recovered from humans, but are assumed to have been contracted from a non-human host. The following species use humans as the primary host:

 M. amphoriforme
 M. buccale
 M. faucium
 M. fermentans
 M. genitalium
 M. hominis
 M. incognitus
 M. lipophilum
 M. orale
 M. penetrans
 M. pirum
 M. pneumoniae
 M. primatum
 M. salivarium
 M. spermatophilum

Pathophysiology 
Mycoplasma species have been isolated from women with bacterial vaginosis. M. genitalium is found in women with pelvic inflammatory disease. In addition, infection is associated with increased risk of cervicitis, infertility, preterm birth and spontaneous abortion. Mycoplasma genitalium has developed resistance to some antibiotics. Mycoplasma species are associated with infant respiratory distress syndrome, bronchopulmonary dysplasia, and intraventricular hemorrhage in preterm infants.

Characteristics 
Over 100 species have been included in the genus Mycoplasma, a member of the class Mollicutes. They are parasites or commensals of humans, animals, and plants. The genus Mycoplasma uses vertebrate and arthropod hosts. Dietary nitrogen availability has been shown to alter codon bias and genome evolution in Mycoplasma and Phytoplasma.

Mycoplasma species are among the smallest free-living organisms (about 0.2 - 0.3 µm in diameter). They have been found in the pleural cavities of cattle suffering from pleuropneumonia. These organisms are often called MLO (mycoplasma-like organisms) or, formerly, PPLO (pleuropneumonia-like organisms).

Important characteristics of Mycoplasma species

 Cell wall is absent and plasma membrane forms the outer boundary of the cell.
 Due to the absence of cell walls these organisms can change their shape and are pleomorphic.
 Lack of nucleus and other membrane-bound organelles.
 Genetic material is a single DNA duplex and is naked.
 Ribosomes are 70S type.
 Possess a replicating disc at one end which assists replication process and also the separation of the genetic materials.
 Heterotrophic nutrition. Some live as saprophytes but the majority are parasites of plants and animals. The parasitic nature is due to the inability of mycoplasmal bacteria to synthesise the required growth factor.

Cell and colony morphology 
Due to the lack of a rigid cell wall, Mycoplasma species (like all Mollicutes)  can contort into a broad range of shapes, from round to oblong. They are pleomorphic and therefore cannot be identified as rods, cocci or spirochetes.

Colonies show the typical "fried egg" appearance (about 0.5 mm in diameter).

Reproduction 
In 1954, using phase-contrast microscopy, continual observations of live cells have shown that Mycoplasma species ("mycoplasmas", formerly called pleuropneumonia-like organisms, PPLO, now classified as Mollicutes) and L-form bacteria (previously also called L-phase bacteria) do not proliferate by binary fission, but by a uni- or multi-polar budding mechanism. Microphotograph series of growing microcultures of different strains of PPLOs, L-form bacteria and, as a control, a Micrococcus species (dividing by binary fission) have been presented.  Additionally, electron microscopic studies have been performed.

Phylogeny 
Previously, Mycoplasma species (often commonly called "mycoplasmas", now classified as Mollicutes) were sometimes considered stable L-form bacteria or even viruses, but phylogenetic analysis has identified them as bacteria that have lost their cell walls in the course of evolution.

The genus Mycoplasma as originally described is highly paraphyletic, as such it was redescibed by Gupta et al. 2018 and its emendation was accompanied by the removal of 78 species. The currently accepted taxonomy is based on the List of Prokaryotic names with Standing in Nomenclature (LPSN) and National Center for Biotechnology Information (NCBI). The proposed taxonomy has been contentious and has not been widely adopted by mycoplasmologists. 

Unassigned species:

 "Ca. M. aoti" Barker et al. 2011
 "Ca. M. corallicola" Neulinger et al. 2009
 "Ca. M. erythrocervae" Watanabe et al. 2010
 "Ca. M. haematocervi" corrig. Watanabe et al. 2010
 "Ca. M. haematodidelphidis" corrig. Messick et al. 2002
 "Ca. M. haematomacacae" corrig. Maggi et al. 2013
 "Ca. M. haematominiopteri" corrig. Millán et al. 2015
 "Ca. M. haematonasua" Collere et al. 2021
 "Ca. M. haematoparvum" Sykes et al. 2005
 "Ca. M. haematovis" corrig. Hornok et al. 2009
 "Ca. M. haemoalbiventris" Pontarolo et al. 2021
 "Ca. M. haemobovis" Meli et al. 2010
 "Ca. M. haemomeles" Harasawa, Orusa &Giangaspero 2014
 "Ca. M. haemomuris" (Mayer 1921) Neimark et al. 2002
 "Ca. M. haemoparvum" Kenny et al. 2004
 "Ca. M. haemosphiggurus" Valente et al. 2021
 M. hafezii Ziegler et al. 2019
 "M. incognitus" Lo et al. 1989
 "M. insons" May et al. 2007
 "Ca. M. kahanei" Neimark et al. 2002
 M. miroungigenitalium Volokhov et al. 2022
 M. miroungirhinis Volokhov et al. 2022
 "M. monodon" Ghadersohi & Owens 1998
 M. phocoenae Volokhov et al. 2022
 M. phocoeninasale Volokhov et al. 2022
 "M. pneumophila" Lyerova et al. 2008
 "Ca. M. ravipulmonis" Neimark, Mitchelmore & Leach 1998
 M. seminis Fischer et al. 2021
 "M. sphenisci" Frasca et al. 2005
 "M. tauri" Spergser et al. 2021
 "M. timone" Greub & Raoult 2001
 "Ca. M. tructae" Sanchez et al. 2020
 "Ca. M. turicense" corrig. Willi et al. 2006
 "M. volis" Dillehay et al. 1995
 "M. vulturii" Oaks et al. 2004

Laboratory contaminant 
Mycoplasma species are often found in research laboratories as contaminants in cell culture. Mycoplasmal cell culture contamination occurs due to contamination from individuals or contaminated cell culture medium ingredients. Mycoplasma cells are physically small – less than 1  µm, so are difficult to detect with a conventional microscope.

Mycoplasmae may induce cellular changes, including chromosome aberrations, changes in metabolism and cell growth. Severe Mycoplasma infections may destroy a cell line. Detection techniques include DNA probe, enzyme immunoassays, PCR, plating on sensitive agar and staining with a DNA stain including DAPI or Hoechst.

An estimated 11 to 15% of U.S. laboratory cell cultures are contaminated with mycoplasma.
A Corning study showed that half of U.S. scientists did not test for Mycoplasma contamination in their cell cultures. The study also stated that, in former Czechoslovakia, 100% of cell cultures that were not routinely tested were contaminated while only 2% of those routinely tested were contaminated (study p. 6). Since the U.S. contamination rate was based on a study of companies that routinely checked for Mycoplasma, the actual contamination rate may be higher. European contamination rates are higher and that of other countries are higher still (up to 80% of Japanese cell cultures).
About 1% of published Gene Expression Omnibus data may have been compromised. Several antibiotic-containing formulations of antimycoplasmal reagents have been developed over the years.

Synthetic mycoplasma genome 

A chemically synthesized genome of a mycoplasmal cell based entirely on synthetic DNA which can self-replicate has been referred to as Mycoplasma laboratorium.

Pathogenicity 

The P1 antigen is the primary virulence factor of mycoplasma. P1 is a membrane associated protein that allows adhesion to epithelial cells. The P1 receptor is also expressed on erythrocytes which can lead to autoantibody agglutination from mycobacteria infection. Several Mycoplasma species can cause disease, including M. pneumoniae, which is an important cause of atypical pneumonia (formerly known as "walking pneumonia"), and M. genitalium, which has been associated with pelvic inflammatory diseases. Mycoplasma infections in humans are associated with skin eruptions in 17% of cases.

Sexually transmitted infections
Mycoplasma and Ureaplasma species are not part of the normal vaginal flora. Some Mycoplasma species are spread through sexual contact.

Infertility 

Some Mycoplasma species have a negative effect on fertility. M. hominis causes male sterility/Genitals inflammation in humans.

Infant mortality

Low birth-weight, preterm infants are susceptible to Mycoplasma infections.

Links to cancer 

Several species of Mycoplasma are frequently detected in different types of cancer cells. These species are:
 M. fermentans
 M. genitalium
 M. hyorhinis
 M. penetrans
 U. urealyticum

The majority of these Mycoplasma species have shown a strong correlation to malignant transformation in mammalian cells in vitro.

Mycoplasma infection and host cell transformation 

The presence of Mycoplasma was first reported in samples of cancer tissue in the 1960s. Since then, several studies tried to find and prove the connection between Mycoplasma and cancer, as well as how the bacterium might be involved in the formation of cancer. Several studies have shown that cells that are chronically infected with the bacteria go through a multistep transformation. The changes caused by chronic mycoplasmal infections occur gradually and are both morphological and genetic. The first visual sign of infection is when the cells gradually shift from their normal form to sickle-shaped. They also become hyperchromatic due to an increase of DNA in the nucleus of the cells. In later stages, the cells lose the need for solid support to grow and proliferate, as well as the normal contact-dependent inhibition cells.

Possible intracellular mechanisms of mycoplasmal malignant transformation 

Karyotypic changes related to mycoplasma infections

Cells infected with Mycoplasma for an extended period of time show significant chromosomal abnormalities. These include the addition of chromosomes, the loss of entire chromosomes, partial loss of chromosomes, and chromosomal translocation. All of these genetic abnormalities may contribute to the process of malignant transformation. Chromosomal translocation and extra chromosomes help create abnormally high activity of certain proto-oncogenes, which caused by these genetic abnormalities and include those encoding c-myc, HRAS, and vav. The activity of proto-oncogenes is not the only cellular function that is affected; tumour suppressor genes are affected by the chromosomal changes induced by mycoplasma, as well. Partial or complete loss of chromosomes causes the loss of important genes involved in the regulation of cell proliferation. Two genes whose activities are markedly decreased during chronic infections with mycoplasma are the Rb and the p53 tumour suppressor genes. Another possible mechanism of carcinogenesis is RAC1 activation by a small GTPase-like protein fragment of Mycoplasma. A major feature that differentiates mycoplasmas from other carcinogenic pathogens is that the mycoplasmas do not cause the cellular changes by insertion of their own genetic material into the host cell. The exact mechanism by which the bacterium causes the changes is not yet known.

 Partial reversibility of malignant transformations

The malignant transformation induced by Mycoplasma species is also different from that caused by other pathogens in that the process is reversible. The state of reversal is, however, only possible up to a certain point during the infection. The window of time when reversibility is possible varies greatly; it depends primarily on the Mycoplasma involved. In the case of M. fermentans, the transformation is reversible until around week 11 of infection and starts to become irreversible between weeks 11 and 18. If the bacteria are killed using antibiotics (i.e. ciprofloxacin or Clarithromycin) before the irreversible stage, the infected cells should return to normal.

Connections to cancer in vivo and future research 

Epidemiologic, genetic, and molecular studies suggest infection and inflammation initiate certain cancers, including those of the prostate. M. genitalium and M. hyorhinis induce malignant phenotype in benign human prostate cells (BPH-1) that were not tumorigenic after 19 weeks of exposure.

Types of cancer associated with Mycoplasma 

Colon cancer: In a study to understand the effects of Mycoplasma contamination on the quality of cultured human colon cancer cells, a positive correlation was found between the number of M. hyorhinis cells present in the sample and the percentage of CD133-positive cells (a glycoprotein with an unknown function).

Gastric cancer: Strong evidence indicates the infection of M. hyorhinis contributes to the development of cancer within the stomach and increases the likelihood of malignant cancer cell development.

Lung cancer: Studies on lung cancer have supported the belief that more than a coincidental positive correlation exists between the appearance of Mycoplasma strains in patients and the infection with tumorigenesis.

Prostate cancer: p37, a protein encoded for by M. hyorhinis, has been found to promote the invasiveness of prostate cancer cells. The protein also causes the growth, morphology, and gene expression of the cells to change, causing them to become a more aggressive phenotype.

Renal cancer: Patients with renal cell carcinoma (RCC) exhibited a significantly high amount of Mycoplasma sp. compared with the healthy control group. This suggests Mycoplasma may play a role in the development of RCC.

See also 
 International Organization for Mycoplasmology (IOM)
 Sexually transmitted disease
 Vaginal flora
 Vaginal infection
 Vaginal disease
 Vaginal health
 Phytoplasma
 List of bacterial orders
 List of bacteria genera

References

External links 

 Ureaplasma Infection: eMedicine Infectious Diseases

 
Mycoplasmataceae
Bacteria genera
Rodent-carried diseases
Sexually transmitted diseases and infections
Infectious causes of cancer
Infertility
Bacterial vaginosis